Vesicle-trafficking protein SEC22b is a protein that in humans is encoded by the SEC22B gene.

Function 

The protein encoded by this gene is a member of the SEC22 family of vesicle trafficking proteins. It seems to complex with SNARE and it is thought to play a role in the ER-Golgi protein trafficking. This protein has strong similarity to Mus musculus and Cricetulus griseus proteins. There is evidence for use of multiple polyadenylation sites for the transcript. SEC22B has been shown to interact with syntaxin 18.

References

Further reading